The Patriotic People's Movement (IKL) was a political organization in Finland. It regarded itself as the successor of the original Patriotic People's Movement that had operated in the interwar years until the end of the Continuation War.

History

The history of the Patriotic People's Movement can be traced to its predecessor – also called Patriotic People's Movement (IKL) – that had operated in the interwar years until the end of the Continuation War. Founding fascist organizations in Finland had been outlawed by the Moscow Armistice that ended the Continuation War and was also politically impossible due to Finnish efforts to maintain working relations with the Soviet Union. This changed with the dissolution of the Soviet Union in the early 1990s that coincided with Finland renouncing the relevant statues of the Moscow Armistice. Many fascist or Nazist organizations were founded at that time. IKL, founded in 1993, was one of the most prominent. Even with the changes, authorities were initially reluctant to register the party. It, however, chose to distinguish it from the original IKL by adopting a slightly different name, IKL, and so succeeded in registration. The group was highly active in its initial years.

Another development that paved the way for IKL took place in 1995 when the populist Finnish Rural Party was bankrupt. This left a void for parties with similar ideology in Finnish politics. Two political forces – IKL and True Finns – sought to replace its role. According to its chairman , IKL was the rightful spiritual successor of SMP, which he regarded in turn as the successor of the original IKL. Järviharju campaigned to get former SMP members to join IKL instead of the True Finns, succeeding in making his group a viable option to replace SMP. Initially, IKL also cooperated with neo-Nazis like Pekka Siitoin and Väinö Kuisma. Later, in the late 1990s, it also sympathized the white power movement such as the band .

In 1998, the organization declared itself a political party, although it still had not been admitted to the party register. When its supporter cards were found to have inconsistencies later the same year, it withdrew its attempt to register. After the blow, it fell into disarray. Its actives  and Jura Jukola went on to found Suomen Sisu. Kuisma gained influence in another party, that had succeeded in being admitted to the party register and had it renamed Isänmaallinen Kansanliike in 2006. The 1993 IKL still remains as a registered association, based in Ilmajoki.

Organization
It had more than twenty local chapters. Its organ, Ajan Suunta was edited in professional standard and managed to be printed more than once per year and had a correspondent Belgium, Matti Repo. The newspaper gradually started to come out with less and less pages and the number of contributors plummeted in 1999 until it stopped appearing in 2000. The slogan of IKL was "Home, Religion and Fatherland". It adopted a black uniform, logo and flag that closely resembled that of its predecessor. The organization's youth wing was called the Blue-and-Blacks, adopting the name of the youth wing of the original IKL. When it was founded in 1995, there were grandiose, world-wide plans for activities, but it only ever held one meeting that same year with no further activities. When IKL sent a delegation a May Day march organized by France's Front National in 1996, a representative of Sinimustat was present. Efforts to form international ties continued when, in turn, Carl Lang, a Front National MEP, was present at the summer meeting of IKL and an attempt to form a network with Eastern European parties.

See also
Politics of Finland
List of political parties in Finland
Elections in Finland

References

Works cited
 

1993 establishments in Finland
Non-registered political parties in Finland
Defunct political parties in Finland
Nationalist parties in Finland
Far-right political parties